"Chateau" is a song by Australian singer songwriters Angus & Julia Stone. It was released in August 2017 as the second single from the duo's fourth studio album Snow.

At the ARIA Music Awards of 2018, the song was nominated for ARIA Award for Song of the Year.

At the APRA Music Awards of 2019, the song won Blues & Roots Work of the Year.

Music video
The music video was directed by Jessie Hill and released on 23 August 2017. The cinematic clip follows two young rebels as they embark on a journey through Mexico City. The main characters are played by actors Dacre Montgomery and Courtney Eaton, who explore the capital by boat, visit a club and hit a wedding where everyone's glass is charged.

Track listings

Charts

Weekly charts

Year-end charts

Certifications

References

2017 songs
2017 singles
APRA Award winners
Angus & Julia Stone songs
Songs written by Julia Stone